Kiniatilla is a genus of parasitic flies in the family Tachinidae.

Species
Kiniatilla brevipalpis Mesnil, 1952
Kiniatilla tricincta Villeneuve, 1938

References

Exoristinae
Tachinidae genera
Taxa named by Joseph Villeneuve de Janti
Diptera of Africa